Baron Tryon, of Durnford in the County of Wiltshire, is a title in the Peerage of the United Kingdom. It was created in 1940 for the Conservative politician George Tryon. He was the son of the naval commander Vice-Admiral Sir George Tryon.  the title is held by the first Baron's great-grandson, the fourth Baron, who succeeded his father in 2018.

The family seat is The Manor House, near Great Durnford, Wiltshire.

Barons Tryon (1940)
George Clement Tryon, 1st Baron Tryon (1871–1940)
Charles George Vivian Tryon, 2nd Baron Tryon (1906–1976)
Anthony George Merrik Tryon, 3rd Baron Tryon (1940–2018)
Charles George Barrington Tryon, 4th Baron Tryon (b. 1976)

The heir apparent is the present holder's son, the Hon. Guy Aylmer George Tryon (b. 2015)

Arms

Notes

References
Kidd, Charles, Williamson, David (editors). Debrett's Peerage and Baronetage (1990 edition). New York: St Martin's Press, 1990, 

Baronies in the Peerage of the United Kingdom
Noble titles created in 1940
Noble titles created for UK MPs